The Canton–Massillon metropolitan statistical area, as defined by the United States Census Bureau, is an area consisting of two counties in Northeast Ohio, anchored by the cities  of Canton and Massillon. As of the 2010 census, the MSA had a population of 404,422. The MSA is also part of the Cleveland–Akron–Canton, OH Combined Statistical Area, which had a population of 3,515,646 in 2010, making it the largest CSA in Ohio.

Counties
Carroll
Stark

Communities

Incorporated cities with more than 30,000 inhabitants
Canton (principal city)
Massillon (principal city)

Townships with more than 30,000 inhabitants
Jackson Township
Perry Township
Plain Township

Incorporated cities with 10,000 to 30,000 inhabitants
Alliance (partial)
North Canton

Townships with 10,000 to 30,000 inhabitants
Canton Township
Lake Township
Lawrence Township
Nimishillen Township

Places with 1,000 to 10,000 inhabitants
Beach City
Brewster
Canal Fulton
Carrollton
East Canton
Greentown (census-designated place)
Hartville
Louisville
Malvern
Minerva (partial)
Navarre
Perry Heights (census-designated place)
Uniontown (census-designated place)
Waynesburg

Places with less than 1,000 inhabitants
Dellroy
East Sparta
Hills and Dales
Leesville
Limaville
Magnolia
Meyers Lake
Sherrodsville
Wilmot

Unincorporated places
Augusta
Avondale
Cairo
East Greenville
Harlem Springs
Marchand
Maximo
Mechanicstown
Middlebranch
New Franklin
North Industry
North Lawrence
Paris
Richville
Robertsville
Waco

Townships

Carroll County

Stark County

Demographics
As of the census of 2000, there were 406,934 people, 159,442 households, and 110,957 families residing within the MSA. The racial makeup of the MSA was 90.84% White, 6.73% African American, 0.25% Native American, 0.51% Asian, 0.02% Pacific Islander, 0.28% from other races, and 1.38% from two or more races. Hispanic or Latino of any race were 0.90% of the population.

The median income for a household in the MSA was $37,667, and the median income for a family was $44,431. Males had a median income of $34,338 versus $22,580 for females. The per capita income for the MSA was $18,559.

See also
Ohio census statistical areas

References

 
Metropolitan areas of Ohio